Semenište is a village in the municipality of Saraj, North Macedonia.

Demographics
According to the 2021 census, the village had a total of 798 inhabitants. Ethnic groups in the village include:

Albanians 754
Macedonians 2
Bosniaks 5
Others 37

References

External links

Villages in Saraj Municipality
Albanian communities in North Macedonia